Legman or Leg man may refer to:

Gershon Legman (1917–1999), American cultural critic and folklorist
Legman, a journalist reporting from the scene of an event
An assistant or gofer
A male with a leg fetish, a type of partialism